The 1979 Victorian Football League (VFL) season was the eighty third season of the VFL. The season saw 76 Australian rules footballers make their senior VFL debut and 41 players transferring to new clubs having previously played in the VFL.

Debuts

References

Australian rules football records and statistics
Australian rules football-related lists
1979 in Australian rules football